"Winter Wonderland" is a song written in 1934 by Felix Bernard and lyricist Richard Bernhard Smith. Due to its seasonal theme, it is often regarded as a Christmas song in the Northern Hemisphere. Since its original recording by Richard Himber, it has been covered by over 200 different artists.

The song's lyrics were about a couple's romance during the winter season. A later version of "Winter Wonderland" (which was printed in 1947) included a "new children's lyric" that transformed it "from a romantic winter interlude to a seasonal song about playing in the snow."  The snowman mentioned in the song's bridge was changed from a minister to a circus clown, and the promises the couple made in the final verse were replaced with lyrics about frolicking.  Singers like Johnny Mathis connected both versions of the song, giving "Winter Wonderland" an additional verse and an additional chorus.

History
Smith, a native of Honesdale, Pennsylvania, was reportedly inspired to write the lyrics after seeing Honesdale's Central Park covered in snow. Smith wrote the lyrics while being treated for tuberculosis in the West Mountain Sanitarium in Scranton.

The song was originally recorded in 1934 for RCA Victor. At the end of a different recording session by Himber and his Hotel Ritz-Carlton Orchestra, with extra time to spare, RCA Victor suggested arranging and recording "Winter Wonderland" using some additional members of its own orchestra, which included Artie Shaw and other established New York City studio musicians.

Guy Lombardo’s version that same year would go on to be one of the biggest hits of 1934.

In Mathis' version, heard on his 1958 LP Merry Christmas, the introduction is sung between the first and the second refrain.

In 1960, Ella Fitzgerald recorded a jazz arrangement of the song for her Verve release, Ella Wishes You a Swinging Christmas.

In 1999, Ringo Starr recorded a version of Winter Wonderland on Mercury Records release, I Wanna Be Santa Claus.

Awards and achievements 
Guy Lombardo's version was the highest on the charts at the time of introduction. Johnny Mercer's version of the song placed #4 on the Billboard airplay chart in 1946. The same season, a version by Perry Como hit the retail top ten; Como would re-record the song for his 1959 Christmas album.

In November 2007, the American Society of Composers, Authors and Publishers (ASCAP) listed "Winter Wonderland" as the most-played ASCAP-member-written holiday song of the previous five years, citing the Eurythmics' 1987 version of the song as the one most commonly played.

Charts

Tony Bennett version

Darlene Love version

Bing Crosby version

Certifications

Tony Bennett version

Michael Bublé version

References

1934 songs
American Christmas songs
Pop standards
Songs about marriage
Song recordings produced by Phil Spector
Song recordings with Wall of Sound arrangements
Songs with music by Felix Bernard
Air Supply songs
Amy Grant songs
Andy Williams songs
The Andrews Sisters songs
Bing Crosby songs
Darlene Love songs
Frank Sinatra songs
Guy Lombardo songs
Gwen Stefani songs
Johnny Mathis songs
Percy Faith songs
Aly & AJ songs